Prakasam may refer to:

 Prakasam district, Andhra Pradesh
 Tanguturi Prakasam (1872-1957), Indian politician and freedom fighter